Phalacrus may refer to:
 Phalacrus (mythology), a character from Ancient Greek mythology
 Phalacrus (beetle), a genus of beetles in the family Phalacridae
 Phalacrus, a genus of fishes in the family Centrolophidae; synonym of Centrolophus